Kenneth McEntyre (born 24 March 1944) is an English cricketer. He played three first-class matches for Surrey between 1965 and 1966.

See also
 List of Surrey County Cricket Club players

References

External links
 

1944 births
Living people
English cricketers
Surrey cricketers
Sportspeople from Chester
Cheshire cricketers